Major General Gerald Cavendish Grosvenor, 6th Duke of Westminster,  (22 December 1951 – 9 August 2016), was a British landowner, businessman, aristocrat, Territorial Army general, and peer. He was the son of Robert Grosvenor, 5th Duke of Westminster, and Viola Lyttelton. He was Chairman of the property company Grosvenor Group. In the first ever edition of The Sunday Times Rich List, published in 1989, he was ranked as the second richest person in the United Kingdom, with a fortune of £3.2 billion (approximately £ in today's value), with only Queen Elizabeth II above him.

Born in Northern Ireland, Grosvenor moved from an island in the middle of Lower Lough Erne to be educated at Sunningdale and Harrow boarding schools in the south of England. After a troubled education, he left school with two O-levels. He entered the Royal Military Academy, Sandhurst, and served in the Territorial Army, where he was promoted to major-general in 2004.

The business also has interests in other parts of Europe. According to The Sunday Times Rich List in 2016, the Duke was worth £9.35 billion, placing him sixth in the list and making him the third-richest British citizen.

The Duke died on 9 August 2016 after suffering a heart attack. The title then passed to his son, Hugh.

Family and other businesses
The Grosvenor family's first development was in Mayfair, Central London, in the early 18th century; the second big development came around 100 years later and was in another exclusive part of London – Belgravia, developed by the family after the end of Napoleonic Wars and the conversion of Buckingham Palace – which is just one mile east.  After developing the two parts of Central London, the family business expanded. During the second half of the 20th century, the business expanded into the Americas and developed Annacis Island and Vancouver, both in British Columbia in the west of Canada in the 1950s.  The family business started developing in Australia in the 1960s. They moved to Asia in the early 1990s and to Continental Europe just before the millennium. In April 2000, the firm moved into new London offices. The business was headed by the 6th Duke himself, who was Chairman of the Trustees.

The Duke was also Director of Claridge's Hotel from 1981 until 1993, and of Marcher Sound from 1992 until 1997.

Early life
As a child the Duke lived on an island in the middle of Lower Lough Erne in Ulster (Ely Lodge, Blaney, County Fermanagh). His early education was in Northern Ireland before he was sent at age 7 to Sunningdale School in Ascot, followed by Harrow. Because of his Ulster accent, the Duke struggled to fit in at first, and even after his accent was "bullied" out of him, he found it difficult to make friends. Unhappy at boarding school, his education suffered. He left school with two O-levels in history and English.

Military career
As  Earl Grosvenor he joined the Territorial Army in 1970, as a trooper, family estate responsibilities having caused him to abandon a Regular Army career in the 9th/12th Lancers.  After entering RMA Sandhurst in 1973, he passed out as an officer cadet and was commissioned a second lieutenant in the Territorial and Army Volunteer Reserve of the Royal Armoured Corps (Queen's Own Yeomanry) on 13 May 1973. He was promoted to lieutenant on 13 May 1975 and to captain on 1 July 1980. He was promoted to the acting rank of major on 1 January 1985 and to the substantive rank on 22 December.

Promoted to lieutenant-colonel on 1 April 1992, he subsequently commanded the North Irish Horse, the Cheshire Yeomanry Squadron, founded by his ancestors, and the Queen's Own Yeomanry. He was promoted to colonel on 31 December 1994 and was appointed honorary colonel of the 7th Regt Army Air Corps (1 January 1996) and the Northumbrian Universities Officer Training Corps (30 November 1995). Promoted to brigadier on 17 January 2000, he was also appointed Honorary Colonel of the Royal Mercian and Lancastrian Yeomanry on 14 May 2001.  He was also appointed Colonel-in-Chief of the Canadian Royal Westminster Regiment, the North Irish Horse, and as Colonel Commandant Yeomanry.

The Duke was Grand Prior of the Priory of England of the Military and Hospitaller Order of St Lazarus of Jerusalem, 1995–2001. In 2004, he was appointed to the new post of Assistant Chief of the Defence Staff (Reserves and Cadets), with promotion in the rank of major-general. In March 2007, having served in the Ministry of Defence as Assistant CDS for four years, he handed over responsibility for 50,000 reservists and 138,000 cadets to Major General Simon Lalor, in the wake of the Eliot Spitzer prostitution scandal in which Westminster was also implicated. The Duke became Deputy Commander Land Forces (Reserves) in May 2011. He retired from the Armed Forces in 2012.

Benevolent work for service personnel
The Duke was President of the BLESMA from 1992, and the Yeomanry Benevolent Fund from 2005, national Vice-President of the Royal British Legion from 1993, and the Reserve Forces' Ulysses Trust from 1995, the Not Forgotten Society from 2004, and Chairman of the Nuffield Trust for the Forces of the Crown from 1992, all until his death.  He was Vice-President of the Royal Engineers Music Foundation 1990–94.

In 2011, having already funded a feasibility study, the Duke purchased the estate at Stanford Hall, Nottinghamshire, to make possible the creation of a Defence and National Rehabilitation Centre (DNRC) to provide the highest quality support for military casualties. Work started on the £300m project in April 2016, and was completed in 2018 to replace those at Headley Court. The Duke remained actively involved in the project until his death.

He was Vice-President of the Royal United Services Institute from 1993 until 2012, President of The Tank Museum, Bovington, from 2002, and a committee member of the National Army Museum between 1988–1997 and from 2013 until his death.

Educational interests
Despite his poor educational attainments, Westminster was given several honorary degrees and fellowships (listed below) in later life and took an outward-looking interest in youth.  He was Director of the International Students Trust from 1976 until 1993, Pro-Chancellor of Keele University from 1986 until 1993, Chancellor of Manchester Metropolitan University from 1992 until 2002, and first appointed Chancellor of the University of Chester in 2005, serving until his death.

He was a supporter of The Prince's Trust, and was a committee member of the Trust and a Patron from 2001 for North West England.

Sports interests and conservation work
His main personal recreations were field shooting and fishing, and he served as President of the British Association for Shooting and Conservation from 1992 until 2000, and the Atlantic Salmon Trust from 2004 until his death, President of the Game and Wildlife Conservancy Trust for 2000–01 and Vice-President thereafter. He was a member of the MCC and Royal Yacht Squadron and President of Worcestershire County Cricket Club in 1984–1986 and of the Youth Sports Trust 1996–2004.

He was President of the committee planning the 2002 Commonwealth Games in Manchester from 1998, and from 1991 until 1994 had been Director of the committee set up to coordinate the projected 2000 Summer Olympic Games and Paralympics that would have been held at Manchester had the British bid succeeded.

Other charities and organisations

President, Scope (formerly the Spastics Society), 1982–2005
President, National Kidney Research Fund, 1985–1997
President, Royal National Institute for the Blind, 1986–2012
President, North of England Zoological Society, 1987 until death
President, Drugs and Alcohol Foundation, 1987–1997
Vice-President, Royal Society of St George, 1987 until death
President, Holstein UK & Ireland (formerly British Holstein Society), 1988
Life Vice-President, National Society for the Prevention of Cruelty to Children, 1988 until death
President, Chester and District Scout Council, 1979 until death
President, Abbeyfield Society, 1989–1995
President, Institution of Environmental Sciences, 1989–2013
Director, Business in the Community (BITC), 1991–1995
Life Governor, Royal Agricultural Society of England
Committee member, North American Advisory Group, British Overseas Trade Board, 1994
Committee member, Nuffield Hospitals, 1995 until death
Vice-President, Country Landowners' Association, 1999 until death
President, Life Education Centre (Drug Prevention), 2000–2012
Vice-President, Royal Smithfield Club, 2004 until death
Foundation Chancellor of the University of Chester, 2005 until death

He served as a judge in Prince Edward's charity television special The Grand Knockout Tournament in 1987.

Personal life

The Duke of Westminster married Natalia Ayesha Phillips, the daughter of Lt-Col. Harold Pedro Joseph Phillips and his wife Georgina Wernher, in 1978. His wife is a descendant of the Russian poet Alexander Sergeyevich Pushkin and therefore of his African ancestor Abram Gannibal as well as of King George II. Their children are:

Lady Tamara Katherine Grosvenor (b. 20 December 1979), married Edward van Cutsem (son of Hugh van Cutsem) on 6 November 2004. They have three children:
Jake Louis Hannibal van Cutsem (b. 21 May 2009)
Louis Hugh Lupus van Cutsem (b. 17 April 2012)
Isla van Cutsem (b. December 2015)
Lady Edwina Louise Grosvenor (b. 4 November 1981), a goddaughter of Diana, Princess of Wales. She is a prison reformer and philanthropist, co-founding The Clink Restaurants. She married Dan Snow on 27 November 2010. They have three children:
Zia Snow (b. 13 October 2011)
Wolf Robert Snow (b. 9 September 2014)
Orla Snow (b. December 2015)
Hugh Grosvenor, 7th Duke of Westminster (b. 29 January 1991), one of Prince George of Wales's seven godparents.
Lady Viola Georgina Grosvenor (b. 12 October 1992).

In 1998, the Duke suffered a nervous breakdown and depression, citing the overwhelming pressures of business and public life. His depression worsened after reports in newspapers that he had employed the services of prostitutes.

Death
The Duke died on 9 August 2016 at Royal Preston Hospital in Preston, Lancashire, after suffering a heart attack at his Abbeystead Estate. A private funeral attended by close relatives was held on 12 August, and a memorial service was held at Chester Cathedral on 28 November. He is buried in the family plot at St Mary's Church, Eccleston.

That the Grosvenor family stood to pay very little, if any, inheritance tax on his £9bn+ fortune led to calls for a review of how the inheritance of trust funds and similar assets are handled in the UK.

Honours

Orders

  20 February 1979 Baronet, 15th baronet, of Eaton (cr. 1621)
 13 January 1987 Commander of the Order of St John (CStJ)
 11 November 1991 Knight of the Order of St John (KStJ)
 30 December 1994 Officer of the Order of the British Empire (OBE)
 23 April 2003 Knight of the Order of the Garter (KG)
 14 June 2008 Companion of the Order of the Bath (CB)
 16 June 2012 Commander of the Royal Victorian Order (CVO)
Decorations
  1994 Territorial Decoration (TD)
  2004 Canadian Forces Decoration (CD)

Medals
 6 February 1977 Queen Elizabeth II Silver Jubilee Medal
 6 February 2002 Queen Elizabeth II Golden Jubilee Medal
 6 February 2012 Queen Elizabeth II Diamond Jubilee Medal
  29 May 2012 Volunteer Reserves Service Medal (VR)

Foreign dynastic orders
  1995 Knight Grand Cross of the Order of Saint Lazarus, (House of Orléans)
  2006 Knight Grand Cross of the Royal Order of Francis I, (House of Bourbon-Two Sicilies)

Other
 1973 He received the Freedom of the City of Chester
 20 July 1981 He received the Freedom of the City of London
 29 March 1982 He was appointed a Deputy Lieutenant of Cheshire (DL)
 1990 He received the Honorary Degree of Doctor of Laws from Keele University.
 1990 He received an Honorary Fellowship from Liverpool Polytechnic 
 1993 He received the Honorary Degree of Doctor of Letters from Manchester Metropolitan University.
 14 March 2000 He received the Honorary Degree of Doctor of Letters from University of Salford
2000 He received the Honorary Degree of Doctor of Laws from the University of Chester
 2001 He received an Honorary Fellowship from the University of Central Lancashire

 2013 He was awarded an Honorary Degree from Harper Adams University.

Honorary military appointments
Honorary Colonel The Queen's Own Yeomanry
Honorary Colonel 7th Regt. Army Air Corps (1 January 1996 – 9 August 2016)
Honorary Colonel The Queen's Own Yeomanry (14 May 2001 – April 2014)
Colonel-in-Chief Royal Westminster Regiment, New Westminster, BC, Canada
Honorary Colonel Yeomanry, Royal Armoured Corps
Honorary Colonel Northumbrian Universities Officer Training Corps (30 November 1995 – 9 August 2016)

Arms

Ancestry

See also
List of billionaires
List of dukes in the peerages of Britain and Ireland
Westminster City Council v Duke of Westminster

Bibliography 
 Quinn, Tom The Reluctant Billionaire: The Tragic Life of Gerald Grosvenor, 6th Duke of Westminster, Biteback Publishing 2017.

References

External links

Grosvenor Estate
Burke's Peerage
Institution of Environmental Sciences
1992 interview by Hunter Davies
[Public Speaking 2012-MIFFY]

|-

|-

1951 births
2016 deaths
People from Omagh
People educated at Harrow School
Graduates of the Royal Military Academy Sandhurst
People from Cheshire
Burials in Cheshire
6
Knights of the Garter
Companions of the Order of the Bath
Commanders of the Royal Victorian Order
Officers of the Order of the British Empire
British billionaires
Military personnel from County Tyrone
British Army major generals
Gerald Grosvenor, 6th Duke of Westminster
People associated with the University of Chester
North Irish Horse officers
Deputy Lieutenants of Cheshire
British Yeomanry officers
Queen's Own Yeomanry officers
Knights of Justice of the Order of St John
Cheshire Yeomanry officers
British landowners
English Anglicans
National Society for the Prevention of Cruelty to Children people
People educated at Sunningdale School
Westminster